Tenmile Creek or Ten Mile Creek may refer to streams in:

California
Tenmile Creek (Kings River), a tributary of the Kings River (California)
Tenmile Creek (South Fork Eel River), in California

Colorado
Tenmile Creek (Colorado)

Georgia
Tenmile Creek (Altamaha River tributary)

Illinois
Tenmile Creek (North Fork Saline River), a tributary of the Saline River (Illinois)

Maryland
Tenmile Creek (Maryland)
Ten Mile Creek, Maryland

Missouri
Tenmile Creek (Cane Creek)
Ten Mile Creek (North Fork Salt River)

Montana
Tenmile Creek (Lewis and Clark County, Montana)

New York
Tenmile Creek (Catskill Creek)

Ohio
Tenmile Creek (Ottawa River), a tributary of the Ottawa River (Lake Erie)

Oregon
Tenmile Creek (Coos County, Oregon)
Tenmile Creek (Lane County, Oregon)

Pennsylvania
Tenmile Creek (Pennsylvania), a tributary of the Monongahela River

Washington
Tenmile Creek (Nooksack River)
Tenmile Creek (Snake River)

West Virginia
Tenmile Creek (Buckhannon River)
Tenmile Creek (West Fork River)

Wisconsin
Tenmile Creek (Wisconsin River tributary)

See also
Ten Mile River (disambiguation)
Ten Mile Creek Bridge (disambiguation)
North Tenmile Creek Trail